This is a list of notable Jewish American jurists. For other famous Jewish Americans, see Lists of American Jews.

Supreme Court of the United States

Federal judges

Appellate judges
 Robert E. Bacharach, Judge of the United States Court of Appeals for the Tenth Circuit (2013–present)
 David J. Barron, Judge of the United States Court of Appeals for the First Circuit (2014–present)
David L. Bazelon, Senior Judge of the United States Court of Appeals for the District of Columbia Circuit (1979–1993), Chief Judge of the United States Court of Appeals for the District of Columbia Circuit (1962–1978) 
 Edward R. Becker, Senior Judge of the United States Court of Appeals for the Third Circuit (2003–2006), Chief Judge of United States Court of Appeals for the Third Circuit (1998–2003)
 Michael Boudin, Judge of the United States Court of Appeals for the First Circuit (1992–2021)
 Daniel Bress, Judge of the United States Court of Appeals for the Ninth Circuit (2019–present)
 Guido Calabresi, Senior Judge of the United States Court of Appeals for the Second Circuit (2009–present), Judge of the United States Court of Appeals for the Second Circuit (1994–2009)
 Michael Chertoff, Judge of the United States Court of Appeals for the Third Circuit (2003–2005)
 Robert Cowen, Senior Judge of the United States Court of Appeals for the Third Circuit (1998–present); Judge of the United States Court of Appeals for the Third Circuit (1987–1998)
 Wilfred Feinberg, Senior Judge of the United States Court of Appeals for the Second Circuit (1991–2014), Chief Judge of the United States Court of Appeals for the Second Circuit (1980–1988), Judge of the United States Court of Appeals for the Second Circuit (1966–1991)
 Joel Flaum, Senior Judge of the United States Court of Appeals for the Seventh Circuit (2020–present), Chief Judge of the United States Court of Appeals for the Seventh Circuit (2000–2006), Judge of the United States Court of Appeals for the Seventh Circuit (1983–2020)
 Phillip Forman, Judge of the United States Court of Appeals for the Third Circuit (1959–1978)
 Jerome Frank, Judge of the United States Court of Appeals for the Second Circuit (1941–1957)
 Abraham Lincoln Freedman, Judge of the United States Court of Appeals for the Third Circuit (1964–1971)
 Michelle Friedland, Judge of the United States Court of Appeals for the Ninth Circuit (2014–present)
 Merrick Garland, Chief Judge of the United States Court of Appeals for the District of Columbia Circuit (2013–2020), Judge of the United States Court of Appeals for the District of Columbia Circuit (1997–2021)
 Leonard I. Garth, Senior Judge of the United States Court of Appeals for the Third Circuit (1986–2016), Judge of the United States Court of Appeals for the Third Circuit (1973–1986)
 Douglas H. Ginsburg, Senior Judge of the United States Court of Appeals for the District of Columbia Circuit (2011–present), Judge of the United States Court of Appeals for the District of Columbia Circuit (2001–2008), Judge of the United States Court of Appeals for the District of Columbia Circuit (1986–2011)
 Irving Loeb Goldberg, Judge of the United States Court of Appeals for the Fifth Circuit (1966–1995)
 Ronald M. Gould, Judge of the United States Court of Appeals for the Ninth Circuit (1999–present)
 Susan P. Graber, Senior Judge of the United States Court of Appeals for the Ninth Circuit (2021–present); Judge of the United States Court of Appeals for the Ninth Circuit (1998–2021)
 Morton Greenberg, Judge of the United States Court of Appeals for the Third Circuit (1987–2021)
 Murray Gurfein, Judge of the United States Court of Appeals for the Second Circuit (1974–1979)
 Pamela Harris, Judge of the United States Court of Appeals for the Fourth Circuit (2014–present)
Andrew D. Hurwitz, Judge of the United States Court of Appeals for the Ninth Circuit (2012–present)
Sandra Segal Ikuta, Judge of the United States Court of Appeals for the Ninth Circuit (2006–present)
 Harry Ellis Kalodner, Senior Judge of the United States Court of Appeals for the Third Circuit (1969–1977), Judge of the United States Court of Appeals for the Third Circuit (1946–1969), Chief Judge of the United States Court of Appeals for the Third Circuit (1965–1966)
 Robert Katzmann, Senior Judge of the United States Court of Appeals for the Second Circuit (2021), Chief Judge of the United States Court of Appeals for the Second Circuit (2013–2021)
 Irving Kaufman, Senior Judge of the United States Court of Appeals for the Second Circuit (1987–1992), Chief Judge of the United States Court of Appeals for the Second Circuit (1971–1980), Judge of the United States Court of Appeals for the Second Circuit (1961–1987)
 Andrew Kleinfeld, Senior Judge of the United States Court of Appeals for the Ninth Circuit (2010–present), Judge of the United States Court of Appeals for the Ninth Circuit (1991–2010)
 Alex Kozinski, Chief Judge of the United States Court of Appeals for the Ninth Circuit (2007–2014), Judge for the United States Court of Appeals for the Ninth Circuit (1985–2017), popular essayist 
 Phyllis A. Kravitch, Judge of the United States Court of Appeals for the Eleventh Circuit (1981–2017)
 Edward Leavy, Senior Judge of the United States Court of Appeals for the Ninth Circuit (1997–present), Judge of the United States Court of Appeals for the Ninth Circuit (1987–1999)
 Harold Leventhal, Judge of the United States Court of Appeals for the District of Columbia Circuit (1965–1979)
 Robert J. Luck, Judge of the United States Court of Appeals for the Eleventh Circuit (2019–present)
 Julian Mack, Senior Judge of the United States Court of Appeals for the Second Circuit (1940–1943), Judge of the United States Court of Appeals for the Second Circuit (1929–1940)
 Julius Marshuetz Mayer, United States Circuit Judge of the United States Court of Appeals for the Second Circuit(1921–1924)
 Steven Menashi, Judge of the United States Court of Appeals for the Second Circuit (2019–present)
 Abner Mikva, Judge of the United States Court of Appeals for the District of Columbia Circuit (1979–1994), Chief Judge of the United States Court of Appeals for the District of Columbia Circuit (1991–1994)
 Roger Miner, Senior Judge of the United States Court of Appeals for the Second Circuit (1997–2012), Circuit Judge of the United States Court of Appeals for the Second Circuit (1985–1997)
 Alison Nathan, Judge of the United States Court of Appeals for the Second Circuit (2022–present), Judge of the United States District Court for the Southern District of New York (2011–2022)
 Jon O. Newman, Senior Judge of the United States Court of Appeals for the Second Circuit (1997–present), Chief Judge of the United States Court of Appeals for the Second Circuit (1993–1997), Judge of the United States Court of Appeals for the Second Circuit(1979–1997)
 Pauline Newman, Judge of the United States Court of Appeals for the Federal Circuit (1984–present)
 Rosemary S. Pooler, Senior Judge of the United States Court of Appeals for the Second Circuit (2022–present); Judge of the United States Court of Appeals for the Second Circuit (1998–2022)
 Richard Posner, Chief Judge of the United States Court of Appeals for the Seventh Circuit (1993–2000), Judge of the United States Court of Appeals for the Seventh Circuit (1981–2017)
 Harry Pregerson, Senior Judge of the United States Court of Appeals for the Ninth Circuit (2015–2017), Judge of the United States Court of Appeals for the Ninth Circuit (1979–2015)
 Sharon Prost, Chief Judge of the United States Court of Appeals for the Federal Circuit (2014–2021), Judge of the United States Court of Appeals for the Federal Circuit (2001–present)
 Neomi Rao, Judge of the United States Court of Appeals for the District of Columbia Circuit (2019–present)
 Robin S. Rosenbaum, Judge of the United States Court of Appeals for the Eleventh Circuit (2014–present)
 Veronica S. Rossman, Judge of the United States Court of Appeals for the Tenth Circuit (2021–present)
 Ilana Rovner, Judge of the United States Court of Appeals for the Seventh Circuit (1992–present)
 Alvin Benjamin Rubin, Senior Judge of the United States Court of Appeals for the Fifth Circuit (1989–1991), Judge of the United States Court of Appeals for the Fifth Circuit (1977–1989)
 Robert D. Sack, Senior Judge of the United States Court of Appeals for the Second Circuit (2009–present), Judge of the United States Court of Appeals for the Second Circuit (1998–2009)
 Bruce M. Selya, Senior Judge of the United States Court of Appeals for the First Circuit (1986–present)
 Patty Shwartz, Judge of the United States Court of Appeals for the Third Circuit (2013–present)
Laurence Silberman, Senior Judge of the United States Court of Appeals for the District of Columbia Circuit (2000–2022), Judge of the United States Court of Appeals for the District of Columbia Circuit (1985–2000)
 Barry G. Silverman, Senior Judge of the United States Court of Appeals for the Ninth Circuit (2016–present), Judge of the United States Court of Appeals for the Ninth Circuit (1998–2016)
 Dolores Sloviter, Senior Judge of the United States Court of Appeals for the Third Circuit (2013–present); Judge of the United States Court of Appeals for the Third Circuit (1979–2013)
 Simon Sobeloff, Senior Judge of the United States Court of Appeals for the Fourth Circuit (1970–1973), Chief Judge of the United States Court of Appeals for the Fourth Circuit (1958–1964), Judge of the United States Court of Appeals for the Fourth Circuit (1956–1970)
 Norman H. Stahl, Senior Judge of the United States Court of Appeals for the First Circuit (2001–present), Judge of the United States Court of Appeals for the First Circuit (1992–2001)
 David Stras, Judge of the United States Court of Appeals for the Eighth Circuit (2018–present)
 Evan Wallach, Senior Judge of the United States Court of Appeals for the Federal Circuit (2021–present); Judge of the United States Court of Appeals for the Federal Circuit (2011–2021)
 Helene White, Senior Judge of the United States Court of Appeals for the Sixth Circuit (2008–present); Judge of the United States Court of Appeals for the Sixth Circuit (2008–2022)
 Jacques L. Wiener Jr., Senior Judge of the United States Court of Appeals for the Fifth Circuit (2010–present); Judge of the United States Court of Appeals for the Fifth Circuit (1990–2010)

District judges
 Ronnie Abrams, Judge of the United States District Court for the Southern District of New York (2012–present)
 Harold A. Ackerman, Senior Judge of the United States District Court for the District of New Jersey (1994–2009), Judge of the United States District Court for the District of New Jersey (1979–1994)
 Lynn S. Adelman, Judge of the United States District Court for the Eastern District of Wisconsin (1997–present)
 Roy Altman, Judge of the United States District Court for the Southern District of Florida (2019–present)
 Sidney Aronovitz, Senior Judge of the United States District Court for the Southern District of Florida (1988–1997), Judge of the United States District Court for the Southern District of Florida (1976–1988)
 Marvin Aspen, Senior Judge of the United States District Court for the Northern District of Illinois (2002–present), Chief Judge of the United States District Court for the Northern District of Illinois (1995–2002), Judge of the United States District Court for the Northern District of Illinois (1979–2002)
 Nancy Atlas, Senior Judge of the United States District Court for the Southern District of Texas (2014–2022), Judge of the United States District Court for the Southern District of Texas (1994–2014)
 Harold Baer Jr., Senior Judge of the United States District Court for the Southern District of New York (2004–2014), Judge of the United States District Court for the Southern District of New York (1994–2004)
 Peter Beer, Senior Judge of the United States District Court for the Eastern District of Louisiana (1994–2018), Judge of the United States District Court for the Eastern District of Louisiana (1979–1994)
 Richard M. Berman, Senior Judge of the United States District Court for the Southern District of New York (2011–present), Judge of the United States District Court for the Southern District of New York (1998–2011)
 Alexander Bicks, Judge of the United States District Court for the Southern District of New York (1954–1963)
 Norman William Black, Senior Judge of the United States District Court for the Southern District of Texas (1996–1997), Chief Judge of the United States District Court for the Southern District of Texas (1992–1996), Judge of the United States District Court for the Southern District of Texas (1979–1996)
 Alan Neil Bloch, Senior Judge of the United States District Court for the Western District of Pennsylvania (1997–present), Judge of the United States District Court for the Western District of Pennsylvania (1979–1997)
 Beth Bloom, Judge of the United States District Court for the Southern District of Florida (2014–present)
 Stanley Blumenfeld, Judge of the United States District Court for the Central District of California (2020–present)
 Mosher Joseph Blumenfeld, Senior Judge of the United States District Court for the District of Connecticut (1977–1988), Chief Judge of the United States District Court for the District of Connecticut (1971–1974), District Judge of the United States District Court for the District of Connecticut (1961–1977)
 Frederic Block, Senior Judge of the United States District Court for the Eastern District of New York (2005–present), Judge of the United States District Court for the Eastern District of New York (1994–2005)
 Naomi Reice Buchwald, Senior Judge of the United States District Court for the Southern District of New York (2012–present), Judge of the United States District Court for the Southern District of New York (1999–2012)
 Charles Breyer, Senior Judge of the United States District Court for the Northern District of California (2011–present), Judge of the United States District Court for the Northern District of California (1997–2011)
 Stanley Brotman, Senior Judge of the United States District Court for the District of New Jersey (1990–2014), Judge of the United States District Court for the District of New Jersey (1975–1990)
 Allison Dale Burroughs, District Judge of the United States District Court for the District of Massachusetts (2014–present)
 Robert N. Chatigny, Senior Judge of the United States District Court for the District of Connecticut (2017–present), Chief Judge of the United States District Court for the District of Connecticut (2003–2009), Judge of the United States District Court for the District of Connecticut (1994–2017)
 Deborah K. Chasanow, Senior Judge of the United States District Court for the District of Maryland (2014–present), Chief Judge of the United States District Court for the District of Maryland (2010–2014), Judge of the United States District Court for the District of Maryland (1993–2014)
 Florence-Marie Cooper, Judge of the United States District Court for the Central District of California (1999–2010)
 Mark Howard Cohen, Judge of the United States District Court for the Northern District of Georgia (2014–present)
 Avern Cohn, Senior Judge of the United States District Court for the Eastern District of Michigan (1999–2022), Judge of the United States District Court for the Eastern District of Michigan (1979–1999)
 James I. Cohn, Senior Judge of the United States District Court for the Southern District of Florida (2016–present), Judge of the United States District Court for the Southern District of Florida (2003–2016)
 Irving Ben Cooper, Senior Judge of the United States District Court for the Southern District of New York (1972–1996), Judge of the United States District Court for the Southern District of New York (1961–1972)
 Susan J. Dlott, Senior Judge of the United States District Court for the Southern District of Ohio (2018–present), Chief Judge of the United States District Court for the Southern District of Ohio (2009–2015), Judge of the United States District Court for the Southern District of Ohio (1995–2018)
 Jan E. DuBois, Senior Judge of the United States District Court for the Eastern District of Pennsylvania (2002–present), Judge of the United States District Court for the Eastern District of Pennsylvania (1988–2002)
 David Norton Edelstein, Senior Judge of the United States District Court for the Southern District of New York (1994–2000), Chief Judge of the United States District Court for the Southern District of New York (1971–1980), Judge of the United States District Court for the Southern District of New York (1951–1994)
 Paul A. Engelmayer, District Judge of the United States District Court for the Southern District of New York (2011–present)
 Gary Feinerman, District Judge of the United States District Court for the Northern District of Illinois (2010–present)
 Martin Leach-Cross Feldman, Judge of the United States District Court for the Eastern District of Louisiana (1983–2022)
 Sandra J. Feuerstein, Senior Judge of the United States District Court for the Eastern District of New York (2015–2021), Judge of the United States District Court for the Eastern District of New York (2003–2015)
 Sherman Glenn Finesilver, Senior Judge of the United States District Court for the District of Colorado (1994), Chief Judge of the United States District Court for the District of Colorado (1982–1994), Judge of the United States District Court for the District of Colorado (1971–1974)
 Herbert Allan Fogel, Judge of the United States District Court for the Eastern District of Pennsylvania (1973–1978)
 Jeremy Fogel, Judge of the United States District Court for the Northern District of California (2014–2018), Judge of the United States District Court for the Northern District of California (1998–2014)
 Marvin E. Frankel, Judge of the United States District Court for the Southern District of New York (1965–1978)
 Emerich B. Freed, District Judge of the United States District Court for the Northern District of Ohio (1941–1955)
 Frank Harlan Freedman, Senior Judge of the United States District Court for the District of Massachusetts (1992–2003), Chief Judge of the United States District Court for the District of Massachusetts (1986–1992), Judge of the United States District Court for the District of Massachusetts (1972–1992)
 Beth Labson Freeman, Judge of the United States District Court for the Northern District of California (2014–present)
 Jerome B. Friedman, Senior Judge of the United States District Court for the Eastern District of Virginia (2010–2011), Judge of the United States District Court for the Eastern District of Virginia (1997–2010)
 Paul L. Friedman, Senior Judge of the United States District Court for the District of Columbia (2010–2011), Judge of the United States District Court for the District of Columbia (1997–2010)
 Jesse M. Furman, District Judge of the United States District Court for the Southern District of New York (2014–present)
 Nina Gershon, Senior Judge of the United States District Court for the Eastern District of New York (2008–present), Judge of the United States District Court for the Eastern District of New York (1996–2008)
 Nancy Gertner, Senior Judge of the United States District Court for the District of Massachusetts (2011), Judge of the United States District Court for the District of Massachusetts (1994–2011)
 Robert Gettleman, Senior Judge of the United States District Court for the Northern District of Illinois (2009–present), Judge of the United States District Court for the Northern District of Illinois (1994-2009)
 Israel Leo Glasser, Judge of the United States District Court for the Eastern District of New York (1981–present)
 Mitchell S. Goldberg, Judge of the United States District Court for the Eastern District of Pennsylvania (2008–present)
 Alan Stephen Gold, Senior Judge of the United States District Court for the Southern District of Florida (2011–present), Judge of the United States District Court for the Southern District of Florida (1997–2011)
 Mark A. Goldsmith, Judge of the United States District Court for the Eastern District of Michigan (2010–present)
 Louis Earl Goodman, Chief Judge of the United States District Court for the Northern District of California (1958–1961), Judge of the United States District Court for the Northern District of California (1942–1961)
 Harold H. Greene, Senior Judge of the United States District Court for the District of Columbia (1995–2000), Judge of the United States District Court for the District of Columbia (1978–1995)
 Steven D. Grimberg, Judge of the United States District Court for the Northern District of Georgia (2019–present)
 Lawrence Gubow, Judge of the United States District Court for the Eastern District of Michigan (1968–1978)
 Alvin Hellerstein, Senior Judge of the United States District Court for the Southern District of New York (2011–present), Judge of the United States District Court for the Southern District of New York (1998–2011) 
 William Bernard Herlands, Judge of the United States District Court for the Southern District of New York (1995–1969)
 Irving Hill, Senior Chief Judge of the United States District Court for the Central District of California (1980–1998), Judge of the United States District Court for the Central District of California (1979–1980), Judge of the United States District Court for the Central District of California (1966–1980)
 Faith S. Hochberg, Judge of the United States District Court for the District of New Jersey (1999–2015)
 Julius Hoffman, Senior Judge of the United States District Court for the Northern District of Illinois (1972–1982), Judge of the United States District Court for the Northern District of Illinois (1953–1972)
 Alexander Holtzoff, Senior Judge of the United States District Court for the District of Columbia (1967–1969), Judge of the United States District Court for the District of Columbia (1945–1967)
 Amy Berman Jackson, Judge of the United States District Court for the District of Columbia (2011–present)
 Ellen Lipton Hollander, Judge of the United States District Court for the District of Maryland (2010-present) 
 Beryl A. Howell, Chief Judge of the United States District Court for the District of Columbia (2010–present)
 Lewis A. Kaplan, Senior Judge of the United States District Court for the Southern District of New York (2011–present), Judge of the United States District Court for the Southern District of New York (1994–2011)
 Lawrence K. Karlton, Senior Judge of the United States District Court for the Eastern District of California (2000–2015), Chief Judge of the United States District Court for the Eastern District of California (1983–1990), Judge of the United States District Court for the Eastern District of California (1979–200)
 David A. Katz, Senior Judge of the United States District Court for the Northern District of Ohio (2005–2016), Judge of the United States District Court for the Northern District of Ohio (1994–2005)
 Bruce William Kauffman, Senior Judge of the United States District Court for the Eastern District of Pennsylvania (2008–2009), Judge of the United States District Court for the Eastern District of Pennsylvania (1997–2008)
 Frank Albert Kaufman, Senior Judge of the United States District Court for the District of Maryland (1986–1987), Chief Judge of the United States District Court for the District of Maryland (1981–1986), Judge of the United States District Court for the District of Maryland (1966–1986)
 Samuel H. Kaufman, Senior Judge of the United States District Court for the Southern District of New York (1955–1960), Judge of the United States District Court for the Southern District of New York (1948–1955)
 Gladys Kessler, Senior Judge of the United States District Court for the District of Columbia (2007–present), Judge of the United States District Court for the District of Columbia (1994–2007)
 Eric R. Komitee, Judge of the United States District Court for the Eastern District of New York (2020–present) 
 Edward R. Korman, Senior Judge of the United States District Court for the Eastern District of New York (2007–present), Chief Judge of the United States District Court for the Eastern District of New York (2000–2007), Judge of the United States District Court for the Eastern District of New York (1985–2007)
 Mark Kravitz, Judge of the United States District Court for the District of Connecticut (2003–2012)
 Robert S. Lasnik, Senior Judge of the United States District Court for the Western District of Washington (2016–present), Chief Judge of the United States District Court for the Western District of Washington (2004–2011), Judge of the United States District Court for the Western District of Washington (1998–2016)
 Morris E. Lasker, Senior Judge of the United States District Court for the Southern District of New York (1983–2009), Judge of the United States District Court for the Southern District of New York (1968–1983)
 Joan A. Lenard, Senior Judge of the United States District Court for the Southern District of Florida (2017–present), Judge of the United States District Court for the Southern District of Florida (1995–2017)
 David F. Levi, Chief Judge of the United States District Court for the Eastern District of California (2003–2007), Judge of the United States District Court for the Eastern District of California (1983–2007)
 Gerald Sanford Levin, Judge of the United States District Court for the Northern District of California (1969–1971)
 Theodore Levin, Chief Judge of the United States District Court for the Eastern District of Michigan (1959–1967), Judge of the United States District Court for the Eastern District of Michigan (1946–1970)
 Jon D. Levy, Chief Judge of the United States District Court for the District of Maine (2019–present), Chief United States district judge of the United States District Court for the District of Maine (2014–present)
 Judith E. Levy, Judge of the United States District Court for the Eastern District of Michigan (2014–present)
 Lewis J. Liman, Judge of the United States District Court for the Southern District of New York (2019–present)
 Sheryl H. Lipman, Judge of the United States District Court for the Western District of Tennessee (2014–present)
 Barbara M. Lynn, Chief Judge of the United States District Court for the Northern District of Texas (2016–present), Judge of the United States District Court for the Northern District of Texas (1999–present)
 Abraham Lincoln Marovitz, Senior Judge of the United States District Court for the Northern District of Illinois (1975–2001), Judge of the United States District Court for the Northern District of Illinois (1963–1975)
 Roslynn R. Mauskopf, Judge of the United States District Court for the Eastern District of New York (2007–present)
 Samuel Mandelbaum, Judge of the United States District Court for the Southern District of New York (1936–1946)
 Howard Matz, Senior Judge of the United States District Court for the Central District of California (2011–2013), Judge of the United States District Court for the Central District of California (1998–2011)
 Peter Jo Messitte, Judge of the United States District Court for the District of Maryland (2008–present), Judge of the United States District Court for the District of Maryland (1993–2008)
 Charles Miller Metzner, Judge of the United States District Court for the Southern District of New York (1977–2009), Judge of the United States District Court for the Southern District of New York (1959–1977)
 Jacob Mishler, Senior Judge of the United States District Court for the Eastern District of New York (1980–2004), Chief Judge of the United States District Court for the Eastern District of New York (1969–1980), Judge of the United States District Court for the Eastern District of New York (1960–1980)
 Grover M. Moscowitz, District Judge of the United States District Court for the Eastern District of New York (1925–1947)
 Barry Ted Moskowitz, Senior Judge of the United States District Court for the Southern District of California (2019–present), Chief Judge of the United States District Court for the Southern District of California (2012–2019), Judge of the United States District Court for the Southern District of California (1995–2019)
 Randolph Moss, Judge of the United States District Court for the District of Columbia (2014–present)
 Mendon Morrill, Judge of the United States District Court for the District of New Jersey (1958–1961)
 Michael S. Nachmanoff, Judge of the United States District Court for the Eastern District of Virginia (2021–present)
 Stewart Albert Newblatt, Senior Judge of the United States District Court for the Eastern District of Michigan (1993–2022), Judge of the United States District Court for the Eastern District of Michigan (1979–1993)
 Casper Platt, Judge of the United States District Court for the Eastern District of Illinois (1949–1965), Chief Judge of the United States District Court for the Eastern District of Illinois (1956–1965)
 Dan A. Polster, Senior Judge of the United States District Court for the Northern District of Ohio (2021–present), Judge of the United States District Court for the Northern District of Ohio (1998–2021)
 Milton Pollack, Senior Judge of the United States District Court for the Southern District of New York (1983–2004), Judge of the United States District Court for the Southern District of New York (1967–1983)
 Edmund Port, Senior Judge of the United States District Court for the Northern District of New York (1976–1986), Judge of the United States District Court for the Northern District of New York (1964–1976)
 Dean Pregerson, Senior Judge of the United States District Court for the Central District of California (2016–present), Judge of the United States District Court for the Central District of California (1996–2016)
 Jed S. Rakoff, Senior Judge of the United States District Court for the Southern District of New York (2010–present), Judge of the United States District Court for the Southern District of New York (1996–2010)
 Simon H. Rifkind, District Judge of the United States District Court for the Southern District of New York (1941–1950)
 Louis Rosenberg, Senior Judge of the United States District Court for the Western District of Pennsylvania (1976–1999), Judge of the United States District Court for the Western District of Pennsylvania (1961–1976)
 Robin L. Rosenberg, Judge of the United States District Court for the Southern District of Florida (2014–present)
 Max Rosenn, Senior Judge of the United States Court of Appeals for the Third Circuit (1981–2006), Judge of the United States Court of Appeals for the Third Circuit (1970–1981)
 Lee Hyman Rosenthal, Chief Judge of the United States District Court for the Southern District of Texas (2016–present), Judge of the United States District Court for the Southern District of Texas (1992–present)
 George Rosling, Judge of the United States District Court for the Eastern District of New York (1961–1973)
 Allyne R. Ross, Senior Judge of the United States District Court for the Eastern District of New York (2011–present), Judge of the United States District Court for the Eastern District of New York (1994–2011)
 Barbara Jacobs Rothstein, Senior Judge of the United States District Court for the Western District of Washington (2011–present), Chief Judge of the United States District Court for the Western District of Washington (1987–1994), Judge of the United States District Court for the Western District of Washington (1980–2011)
 Carl Bernard Rubin, Chief Judge of the United States District Court for the Southern District of Ohio (1979–1990), Judge of the United States District Court for the Southern District of Ohio (1971–1995)
 Julie Rubin, Judge of the United States District Court for the District of Maryland (2022-present)
 Lee Rudofsky, Judge of the United States District Court for the Eastern District of Arkansas (2019–present)
 Leo F. Rayfiel, Senior Judge of the United States District Court for the Eastern District of New York (1966–1978), Judge of the United States District Court for the Eastern District of New York (1947–1966)
 Patti B. Saris, Chief Judge of the United States District Court for the District of Massachusetts (2013–2019), Judge of the United States District Court for the District of Massachusetts (1993–present)
 Shira Scheindlin, Senior Judge of the United States District Court for the Southern District of New York (2011–2016), Judge of the United States District Court for the Southern District of New York (1994–2011)
 Charles Schwartz Jr., Senior Judge of the United States District Court for the Eastern District of Louisiana (1991–2012), Judge of the United States District Court for the Eastern District of Louisiana (1976–1991)
 Harvey E. Schlesinger, Senior Judge of the United States District Court for the Middle District of Florida (2006–present), Judge of the United States District Court for the Middle District of Florida (1991–2006)
 Morey Leonard Sear, Senior Judge of the United States District Court for the Eastern District of Louisiana (2000–2004), Chief Judge of the United States District Court for the Eastern District of Louisiana (1992–1999), Judge of the United States District Court for the Eastern District of Louisiana (1976–2000)
 Allen G. Schwartz, Judge of the United States District Court for the Southern District of New York (1993–2003)
 Edward Joseph Schwartz, Senior Judge of the United States District Court for the Southern District of California (1982–2000), Chief Judge of the United States District Court for the Southern District of California (1969–1982), Judge of the United States District Court for the Southern District of California (1968–1982)
 Murray Merle Schwartz, Senior Judge of the United States District Court for the District of Delaware (1989–2013), Chief Judge of the United States District Court for the District of Delaware (1985–1989), Judge of the United States District Court for the District of Delaware  (1974–1989)
 Berle M. Schiller, Senior Judge of the United States District Court for the Eastern District of Pennsylvania (2012–present), Judge of the United States District Court for the Eastern District of Pennsylvania (2000–2012)
 Norma Levy Shapiro, Senior Judge of the United States District Court for the Eastern District of Pennsylvania (1998–2016), Judge of the United States District Court for the Eastern District of Pennsylvania (1978–1998)
 Michael H. Simon, Judge of the United States District Court for the District of Oregon (2011–present)
 George Z. Singal, Senior Judge of the United States District Court for the District of Maine (2013–present), Chief Judge of the United States District Court for the District of Maine (2003–2009), Judge of the United States District Court for the District of Maine (2000–2013)
 Joel H. Slomsky, Senior Judge of the United States District Court for the Eastern District of Pennsylvania (2008–present)
Christina A. Snyder, Senior Judge of the United States District Court for the Central District of California (2016–present), Judge of the United States District Court for the Central District of California (1997–2016)
 Gus J. Solomon, Judge of the United States District Court for the District of Oregon (1971–1987), Chief Judge of the United States District Court for the District of Oregon (1958–1971), Judge of the United States District Court for the District of Oregon (1949–1971) 
 Arthur Spatt, Senior Judge of the United States District Court for the Eastern District of New York (2004–2020), Judge of the United States District Court for the Eastern District of New York (1989–2004)
 Sidney H. Stein, Senior Judge of the United States District Court for the Southern District of New York (2010–present), Judge of the United States District Court for the Southern District of New York (1995–2010)
 Herbert Jay Stern, Judge of the United States District Court for the District of New Jersey (1973–1987)
 Sidney Sugarman, Senior Judge of the United States District Court for the Southern District of New York (1971–1974), Chief Judge of the United States District Court for the Southern District of New York (1966–1971), Judge of the United States District Court for the Southern District of New York (1949–1971)
 Hubert Irving Teitelbaum, Judge of the United States District Court for the Western District of Pennsylvania (1985–1995), Chief Judge of the United States District Court for the Western District of Pennsylvania (1982–1985), Judge of the United States District Court for the Western District of Pennsylvania (1970–1985)
 Amy Totenberg, Judge of the United States District Court for the Northern District of Georgia (2011–2021)
 David G. Trager, Senior Judge of the United States District Court for the Eastern District of New York (2006–2011), Judge of the United States District Court for the Eastern District of New York (1993–2006)
Jacob Trieber, Judge of the United States District Court for the Eastern District of Arkansas (1900–1927).
 Robert Joseph Ward, Judge of the United States District Court for the Southern District of New York (1991–2003), Judge of the United States District Court for the Southern District of New York (1972–1991)
 Jacob Weinberger, Senior Judge of the United States District Court for the Southern District of California (1958–1974), Judge of the United States District Court for the Southern District of California (1946–1958)
 Charles R. Weiner, Judge of the United States District Court for the Eastern District of Pennsylvania (1988–2005), Judge of the United States District Court for the Eastern District of Pennsylvania (1967–1988)
 Edward Weinfeld, Judge of the United States District Court for the Southern District of New York (1950–1988)
 Jack B. Weinstein, Senior Judge of the United States District Court for the Eastern District of New York (1993–2021), Chief Judge of the United States District Court for the Eastern District of New York (1980–1988), Judge of the United States District Court for the Eastern District of New York (1967–1993)
 Albert Charles Wollenberg, Judge of the United States District Court for the Northern District of California (1975–1981), Judge of the United States District Court for the Northern District of California (1958–1975)
 Joshua Wolson, Judge of the United States District Court for the Eastern District of Pennsylvania (2019–present)
 Charles Edward Wyzanski Jr., Judge of the United States District Court for the District of Massachusetts (1971–1986), Chief Judge of the United States District Court for the District of Massachusetts (1965–1971), Judge of the United States District Court for the District of Massachusetts (1941–1971)
 Rya Zobel, Senior Judge of the United States District Court for the District of Massachusetts (2014–present), Judge of the United States District Court for the District of Massachusetts (1979–2014)

Solicitors General
 Philip Perlman, Solicitor General of the United States (1947–1952)
 Simon Sobeloff, Solicitor General of the United States (1954–1956)
 Daniel Mortimer Friedman, Acting Solicitor General of the United States (1977)
 Charles Fried, Solicitor General of the United States (1985–1989)
 Barbara Underwood, Acting Solicitor General of the United States (2001)
 Seth P. Waxman, Solicitor General of the United States (1997–2001)
 Elena Kagan, Solicitor General of the United States (2009–2010)

U.S. Attorneys General
 Edward H. Levi, United States Attorney General (1975–1977)
 Michael Mukasey, United States Attorney General (2007–2009)
 Jeffrey A. Rosen, acting United States Attorney General (2020–2021)
 Merrick Garland, United States Attorney General (2021–present)

Confederate Attorneys General
 Judah P. Benjamin, Confederate States Attorney General (1861)

U.S. Attorneys
 Geoffrey Berman, United States Attorney for the Southern District of New York (2018–2020)
 Adam L. Braverman, United States Attorney for the Southern District of California (2017–2019) 
 Richard Blumenthal, United States Attorney for the District of Connecticut (1977–1981)
 Lev Dassin, Acting United States Attorney for the Southern District of New York (2008–2009)
 Steve Dettelbach, United States Attorney for the Northern District of Ohio (2009–2016) 
 David B. Fein, United States Attorney for the District of Connecticut (2010–2013)
 Paul J. Fishman, United States Attorney for the District of New Jersey (2009–2017) 
 Carla B. Freedman, United States Attorney for the Northern District of New York (2021–present) 
 Rachael A. Honig, Acting United States Attorney for the District of New Jersey (2021) 
 Joel Klein, Chancellor of New York City Schools (2002–2011), United States Assistant Attorney General for the Antitrust Division (1996–2000), Law clerk for U.S. Supreme Court Justice Lewis F. Powell Jr.
 David Kustoff, United States Attorney for the Western District of Tennessee (2006–2008)
 Mark Lesko, Acting United States Attorney for the Eastern District of New York (2021)
 Harry Litman, U.S. Attorney for the Western District of Pennsylvania (1998–2001)
 Robert Morganthau, United States Attorney for the Southern District of New York (1961–1970)
 Rod Rosenstein, United States Attorney for the District of Maryland (2005–2017), United States Deputy Attorney General (2017–2019)
 Irving Saypol, United States Attorney for the Southern District of New York (1941–1951)
 Philip R. Sellinger, United States Attorney for the District of New Jersey (2021–present)
 Michael R. Sherwin, Acting United States Attorney for the District of Columbia (2020–2021)
 Audrey Strauss, United States Attorney for the Southern District of New York (2020–2021)
 Joyce Vance, United States Attorney for the Northern District of Alabama (2009–2017)
 Kenneth L. Wainstein, United States Attorney for the District of Columbia (2004–2006)
 Aaron L. Weisman, United States Attorney for the District of Rhode Island (2019–2021)
 David C. Weiss, United States Attorney for the District of Delaware (2018–present)

White House Counsel
 Samuel Rosenman, White House Counsel (1943–1946)
 Ted Sorensen, White House Counsel (1961–1964)
 Myer Feldman, White House Counsel  (1964–1965)
 Robert Lipshutz, White House Counsel (1977–1979)
 Bernard Nussbaum, White House Counsel (1993–1994)
 Robert Bauer, White House Counsel (2010–2011)

State Supreme Court Justices
 Ruth Abrams, Associate Justice of the Massachusetts Supreme Judicial Court (1978–2000)
 Shirley Abrahamson, Chief Justice of the Wisconsin Supreme Court (1996–2015), Associate Justice of the Wisconsin Supreme Court (1976–2019)
 Henry E. Ackerson Jr., Associate Justice of the Supreme Court of New Jersey (1948–1952)
 Max Baer, Chief Justice of the Pennsylvania Supreme Court (2021-2022), Associate Justice of Supreme Court of Pennsylvania (2004–2021)
 Carolyn Berger, Associate Justice of the Delaware Supreme Court (1994–2014)
 Charles C. Bernstein, Chief Justice of the Arizona Supreme Court (1962–1963, 1967), Associate Justice of the Arizona Supreme Court (1959–1969)
 Richard H. Bernstein, Associate Justice of the Michigan Supreme Court (2015–present)
 Nancy A. Becker Associate Justice of the Nevada Supreme Court (1999–2007)
 Charles Breidel, Chief Judge of the New York Court of Appeals (1974–1978)
 Elissa F. Cadish, Associate Justice of the Nevada Supreme Court (2019–present)
 Michael Cherry, Chief Justice of the Nevada Supreme Court (2012–2013, 2017–2018) Associate Justice of the Nevada Supreme Court (2007–2009)
 Herbert B. Cohen, Associate Justice of the Pennsylvania Supreme Court (1957–1970)
 William D. Cohen, Associate Justice of the Vermont Supreme Court (2019–present)
 Raymond Ehrlich, Associate Justice of the Florida Supreme Court (1981–1990)
 Arthur J. England Jr., Chief Justice of the Florida Supreme Court (1978–1980), Associate Justice of the Florida Supreme Court (1975–1981)
 Paul Feinman, Associate Judge of the New York Court of Appeals (2017–2021)
 Stanley G. Feldman, Chief Justice of the Arizona Supreme Court (1992–1997), Justice of the Arizona Supreme Court (1982–2002)
 Jacob Fuchsberg, Associate Judge of the New York Court of Appeals (1975–1983)
 Stanley Fuld, Chief Judge of the New York Court of Appeals (1967–1973)
 Ralph Gants, Chief Justice of the Massachusetts Supreme Judicial Court (2014–2020), Associate Justice of the Massachusetts Supreme Judicial Court (2009–2014)
 Maureen McKenna Goldberg, Associate Justice of the Rhode Island Supreme Court (1997–present)
 Andrew Gould, Associate Justice of the Arizona Supreme Court (2016–2021)
 Joshua Groban, Associate Justice of the Supreme Court of California (2019–present)
 Hattie Leah Henenberg, Associate Justice of the Supreme Court of Texas (1925)
 Daniel L. Herrmann, Associate Justice of the Delaware Supreme Court (1965–1968)
 Solomon Heydenfeldt, Associate Justice of the California Supreme Court (1852–1857)
 Nathan L. Jacobs, Associate Justice of the New Jersey Supreme Court (1948, 1952–1975)
 Benjamin Kaplan, Associate Justice of the Massachusetts Supreme Judicial Court (1972–1981) 
 Jill Karofsky, Associate Justice of the Wisconsin Supreme Court (2020–present)
 Joette Katz, Associate Justice of the Connecticut Supreme Court (1992–2011)
 Judith Kaye, Chief Judge of the New York Court of Appeals (1993–2008)
 Robert G. Klein, Associate Justice of the Supreme Court of Hawaii (1992–2000)
 Gerald Kogan, Chief Justice of the Florida Supreme Court (1996–1998), (Associate Justice of the Florida Supreme Court (1987–1998)
 Leondra Kruger, Associate Justice of the California Supreme Court (2015–present)
 Irving Lehman, Chief Judge of the New York Court of Appeals (1940–1945)
 Jonathan Lippmann, Chief Judge of the New York Court of Appeals (2009–2015)
 David A. Lowy, Associate Justice of the Massachusetts Supreme Judicial Court (2016–present)
 Barbara Lenk, Acting Chief Justice of the Massachusetts Supreme Judicial Court (2020), Associate Justice of the Massachusetts Supreme Judicial Court (2011–2020)
 Lindsey Miller-Lerman, Justice of the Nebraska Supreme Court, 2nd Judicial District (1998–present)
 Henry A. Lyons, Chief Justice of California (1852), Associate Justice of the California Supreme Court (1849–1851)
 Stephen Markman, Chief Justice of the Michigan Supreme Court (2017–2019), Associate Justice of the Michigan Supreme Court (1999–2020)
 Bernard Meyer, Associate Judge of the New York Court of Appeals (1979–1986)
 Franklin J. Moses Sr., Chief Justice of the South Carolina Supreme Court (1868–1877)
 Stanley Mosk, Associate Justice of the California Supreme Court (1964–2001)
 Barbara Pariente, Chief Justice of the Supreme Court of Florida (2004–2006), Associate Justice of the Supreme Court of Florida (1997–2019)
 Morris Pashman, Associate Justice of the New Jersey Supreme Court (1973–1982)
 Jay Rabinowitz, Chief Justice of Alaska Supreme Court (1972–1992), Associate Justice of the Alaska Supreme Court (1965–1997)
 Stuart Rabner, Chief Justice of the New Jersey Supreme Court (2007–present)
 Eric S. Rosen, Associate Justice of the Kansas Supreme Court (2003–present)
 Albert Rosenblatt, Associate Judge of the New York Court of Appeals (1998–2007)
 Sidney M. Schreiber, Associate Justice of the New Jersey Supreme Court (1975–1984)
 Abbi Silver, Associate Justice of the Nevada Supreme Court (2019–present)
 Lee Solomon, Associate Justice of the Supreme Court of New Jersey (2014–present)
 Leslie Stein, Associate Judge of the New York Court of Appeals (2015–present)
 Melissa Standridge, Associate Justice of the Kansas Supreme Court (2020–present)
 Gary Saul Stein, Associate Justice of the New Jersey Supreme Court (1985–2002)
 Samuel Steinfeld, Chief Justice of the Supreme Court of Kentucky (1972–1975)
 Jacob Tanzer, Associate Justice of the Oregon Supreme Court (1980–1982)
 Richard B. Teitelman, Chief Justice of the Supreme Court of Missouri (2011–2013), Associate Judge of the Supreme Court of Missouri (2002–2016)
 Mathew Tobriner, Associate Justice of the California Supreme Court (1962–1982)
 Sol Wachtler, Chief Judge of the New York Court of Appeals (1985–1992)
 David Wecht, Associate Justice of the Supreme Court of Pennsylvania (2016–present)
 Joseph Weintraub, Chief Justice of the New Jersey Supreme Court (1957–1973)
 Robert Wilentz, Chief Justice of the New Jersey Supreme Court (1979–1996)

State Attorneys General

Scholars 
 Floyd Abrams, William J. Brennan Jr. visiting Professor at the Columbia University Graduate School of Journalism, expert on constitutional law that has argued in front of the Supreme Court on 13 occasions
 Alexander Bickel, legal scholar and expert on the United States Constitution
 Erwin Chemerinsky, Dean of the University of California, Berkeley, School of Law, legal scholar
 Alexander Bickel, legal scholar and Constitutional expert
 Mitchell Berman, Leon Meltzer Professor of Law at the University of Pennsylvania Law School, Professor of Philosophy at the University of Pennsylvania  
 Erwin Chemerinsky, legal scholar known for his studies of United States constitutional law and federal civil procedure and Dean of the UC Berkeley School of Law
 Alan Dershowitz, former Felix Frankfurter Professor of Law at Harvard Law School, author
 Ronald Dworkin, former Frank Henry Sommer Professor of Law and Philosophy at New York University, former Chair of Jurisprudence at University of Oxford, legal scholar, philosopher
 Richard Epstein, legal scholar and Laurence A. Tisch Professor of Law at New York University
 Noah Feldman, author and Felix Frankfurter Professor of Law at Harvard Law School
 Jill Fisch, Saul A. Fox Distinguished Professor of Business Law at the University of Pennsylvania Law School
 Michael Gerhardt, Samuel Ashe Distinguished Professor of Constitutional Law at the University of North Carolina School of Law
 Abraham S. Goldstein, Dean of Yale Law School (1970–1975)
 Tom Goldstein, lawyer known for his advocacy before and blogging about the Supreme Court of the United States
 Arthur Lehman Goodhart, Professor of Jurisprudence at the University of Oxford
 Risa L. Goluboff, Dean of the University of Virginia School of Law
 Irving L. Gornstein, executive director of the Supreme Court Institute and a Visiting Professor at Georgetown University Law Center
 Jack Greenberg, lawyer for the Brown v. Board of Education case, worked for the NAACP Legal Defense and Educational Fund, and assisted establishing the Mexican American Legal Defense and Educational Fund (MALDEF) with Pete Tijerina
 Alan Gura, litigator who successfully argued two landmark constitutional cases before the United States Supreme Court, District of Columbia v. Heller and McDonald v. Chicago
 Pamela Karlan, professor of law at Stanford Law School
 Michael Klarman, Kirkland & Ellis Professor at Harvard Law School
 David Leebron, Dean of Columbia Law School (1996–2004)
 Lance Liebman, Director of the American Law Institute (1999–2014), Dean of Columbia Law School (1991–1996)
 Nathan Lewin, lawyer for the Zivotofsky v. Clinton case, visiting professor, professor and First Amendment advocate 
 Martha Minow, Dean of Harvard Law School (2009–2017)
 Jeffrey Rosen, constitutional scholar and president and CEO of the National Constitution Center
 Albert J. Rosenthal, Dean of Columbia Law School (1979–1984)
 Eugene V. Rostow, Dean of Yale Law School (1955–1965)
 Jed Rubenfeld, Robert R. Slaughter Professor of Law at Yale Law School
 David Rudovsky, Senior Fellow at the University of Pennsylvania Law School, MacArthur Fellow
 Albert Sacks, Dean of Harvard Law School (1971–1981)
 David Schizer, Dean of Columbia Law School (2004–2014)
 Michael I. Sovern, Dean of Columbia Law School (1970–1979)
 Cass Sunstein,  legal scholar, particularly in the fields of constitutional law, administrative law, environmental law, and law and behavioral economics
 Robert A. Stein, Everett Fraser Professor of Law at the University of Minnesota
 Larry Tribe, Carl M. Loeb University Professor at Harvard Law School
 Steve Vladeck, Charles Alan Wright Chair in Federal Courts at the University of Texas School of Law
 Eugene Volokh, Gary T. Schwartz Professor of Law at the UCLA School of Law
 Michael Waldman, president of the Brennan Center for Justice at NYU School of Law
 Amy Wax, Robert Mundheim Professor of Law at the University of Pennsylvania Law School

Public figures 
 Elliott Abrams, politician and lawyer, who has served in foreign policy positions for Presidents Ronald Reagan, George W. Bush, and Donald Trump 
 Leslie Abramson, lawyer known for her role in the legal defense of Lyle and Erik Menendez
 Gloria Allred, lawyer and radio talk show host
 Ben Brafman, American criminal defense attorney
 Marcia Clark, prosecutor and television correspondent known for being the lead prosecutor in the O. J. Simpson murder trial
 Roy Cohn, lawyer, chief-council for the Army–McCarthy hearings 
 Lanny Davis, political operative, lawyer, consultant, lobbyist, author, and television commentator
 Marc Elias, attorney specializing in election law, voting rights and redistricting
 Marc Elias, American election law and voting rights attorney, general counsel for Hillary Clinton 2016 presidential campaign and John Kerry 2004 presidential campaign, founder of Elias Law Group
 Doug Emhoff, entertainment lawyer and a distinguished visiting professor at Georgetown University Law Center
 Ed Fagan, reparations lawyer, disbarred in New York and New Jersey for stealing money from Holocaust survivors
 Russ Feingold, United States Senator from Wisconsin (1993–2011), President of the American Constitution Society
 Geoffrey Fieger, American attorney and occasional legal commentator for NBC and MSNBC
 Bertram Fields, Harvard-trained lawyer, famous for his work in the field of entertainment law
 Richard L. Fox, tax attorney
 Benjamin Ginsberg, Republican election lawyer 
 Jane C. Ginsburg, Morton L. Janklow Professor of Literary and Artistic Property Law at Columbia Law School
 Martin D. Ginsburg, American lawyer who specialized in tax law
 Daniel S. Goldman, majority counsel in the first impeachment inquiry against Donald Trump
 Stephen Harmelin, lawyer who specializes in corporate and transactional law
 Elie Honig, CNN senior legal analyst
 Ed Koch, politician, lawyer, political commentator, film critic, and television personality
 William Kunstler, U.S. lawyer famous for defending controversial "radical" clients such as the "Chicago Seven" protesters of the 1968 Democratic National Convention
 Samuel Leibowitz, defense attorney for the Scottsboro Boys
 Ari Melber, chief legal correspondent for MSNBC
 Peter Neufeld, founding partner in the civil rights law firm Neufeld Scheck & Brustinco, founder of the Innocence Project and defense lawyer for O. J. Simpson
 Dean Preston, member of San Francisco Board of Supervisors, civil rights attorney, democratic-socialist activist
 Louis Nizer, civil trial attorney and best-seller author.
 Jamie Raskin, U.S. Representative for Maryland's 8th congressional district and former law professor at Washington College of Law
 Mimi Rocah, Westchester County District Attorney
 David Rubenstein, billionaire businessman, philanthropist, former financial analyst and lawyer
 Barry Scheck, co-founder of the Innocence Project and defense lawyer for O. J. Simpson
 David Schoen, attorney specializing in federal criminal defense and civil rights law and counsel representing former president Donald Trump during his second impeachment trial
 Eric Schumacher, New York State Supreme Court, Elected New York City Civil Court Judge, serving as Acting New York State Supreme Court Justice 
 Jerome J. Shestack, president of the American Bar Association (1997–1998)
 Judy Sheindlin, star of Judge Judy, author, television personality, former Manhattan family court judge, civil court judge, and prosecutor
 Ben Shapiro, conservative political commentator, author, and attorney
 Robert Shapiro, American lawyer and  defense lawyer for O. J. Simpson
 Adam Silver, Commissioner of the National Basketball Association, lawyer
 Arlen Specter, lawyer, author, and United States Senator from Pennsylvania
 David Stern, former Commissioner of the National Basketball Association, lawyer
 Jeffrey Toobin, lawyer, author and legal analyst for CNN and The New Yorker
 Joseph Wapner, presiding judge of the ongoing reality court show The People's Court

Notes

See also 

 List of first minority male lawyers and judges in the United States
 List of first women lawyers and judges in the United States
 List of African-American jurists
List of Asian American jurists
 List of Hispanic/Latino American jurists
 List of LGBT jurists in the United States
List of Native American jurists

References 

Jurists
Jewish